Gaspereau Press is a Canadian book publishing company, based in Kentville, Nova Scotia. Established in 1997 by Andrew Steeves and Gary Dunfield, the company's philosophy emphasizes "making books that reinstate the importance of the book as a physical object", maintaining control over the design and the manufacturing quality of its titles as one of the few Canadian publishing houses that continues to print and bind its own books in-house.

The company attracted press attention in 2010 when one of its titles, Johanna Skibsrud's novel The Sentimentalists, won the Scotiabank Giller Prize. The book, which had been rejected by several larger publishing houses before Gaspereau picked it up, had originally been published in a limited run of just 800 copies; however, the award win pushed demand for the book well beyond the 1,000 copies per week that the company's printing press could produce at maximum capacity, resulting in the book being unavailable in stores for almost two weeks after the Giller announcement. The company in the meantime announced that it had sold the novel's trade paperback rights to Douglas & McIntyre, while it will continue to print a smaller run of the novel's original edition for book collectors.

References

External links
Gaspereau Press

Book publishing companies of Canada
Companies based in Nova Scotia
Publishing companies established in 1997
Small press publishing companies
1997 establishments in Nova Scotia